The coastal day gecko (Cnemaspis littoralis) is a species of gecko found in the Western Ghats of India.

Distribution
This gecko occurs in Malabar, Nilambur, and Nellakota, on the west side of the Nilgiris; it is found on trees in dry teak forests. Jerdon's type specimen was obtained in a warehouse on the seacoast.

References

 Beddome, R.H. 1871 Descriptions of new reptiles from the Madras Presidency. Madras Monthly J. Med. Sci., 4: 401-404 [Reprint: J. Soc. Bibliogr. Nat. Sci., London, 1 (10): 324–326, 1940.
 Jerdon, T.C. 1853 Catalogue of the Reptiles inhabiting the Peninsula of India. Part 1. J. Asiat. Soc. Bengal  xxii [1853]: 462-479
 Vivek Philip Cyriac & P.K. Umesh 2013 Current status of Cnemaspis littoralis (Jerdon, 1853) (Sauris: Gekkonidae) with Designatio of a Neotype. Taprobanica 5 (1): 36–43.

Cnemaspis
Reptiles described in 1854